Sheffield is a city in South Yorkshire, England.

Sheffield may also refer to:

Academic organisations
 University of Sheffield, Sheffield, England
 Sheffield Academic Press, an academic imprint of the university until 2003
 Sheffield Phoenix Press, an academic imprint based in the UK city specialising in Bible studies 
 Sheffield Scientific School, Yale College, U.S.

Places

United States
 Sheffield, Alabama
 Sheffield, Illinois
 Sheffield, Iowa
 Sheffield, Massachusetts
 Sheffield, Kansas City, Missouri
 Sheffield, Ohio
 Sheffield Lake, Ohio
 Sheffield, Pennsylvania
 Sheffield, Texas
 Sheffield, Vermont, a New England town
 Sheffield (CDP), Vermont, census-designated place in the town

Other countries
 Sheffield, Tasmania, Australia
 Sheffield Parish, New Brunswick, Canada
 Sheffield, New Zealand
 Sheffield, Cornwall, England
 City of Sheffield, a district of South Yorkshire, England
 Sheffield manor, Burghfield, England

People 
 Sheffield (surname), including a list of people with the surname
 Sheffield baronets, a title in the Baronetage of Great Britain

Sports
 Sheffield F.C., an English football club
 Sheffield United F.C., an English football club
 Sheffield Wednesday F.C., an English football club
 Sheffield Eagles, an English rugby league club
 Sheffield RUFC, an English rugby union club 
 Sheffield Tigers RUFC, an English rugby union club 
 Sheffield Shield, an Australian cricket competition
 Sheffield Steelers, an English ice hockey team 
 Sheffield Tigers, an English speedway team

Other uses
 , the name of several warships in the Royal Navy
 Sheffield (album), by Scooter, 2000

See also 

 Sheffield station (disambiguation)